San Francisco de Asis was a Spanish 74-gun ship of the line launched in 1767 from the royal shipyard in Guarnizo (Cantabria). She was wrecked after the Battle of Trafalgar in 1805 near Puerto de Santa Maria.

History 
On January 25, 1797, the San Francisco de Asís, under the command of Captain Alonso de Torres y Guerra, was on patrol off the coast of Cádiz for the protection of Spanish ships arriving with goods from America when it was attacked by three British frigates and a corvette. The Spanish ship faced them in hard combat and despite the inequality of forces, the San Francisco de Asís made the English ships flee causing them various damages and without hardly suffering them. The ship was repaired and on February 14 of that same year took part in the Battle of Cape St. Vincent.

Later it participated in the Battle of Trafalgar under the command of Captain Luis Antonio Flores. He did not perform much because of his unfavorable position in the course of the combat. After the battle and after repairing some of the breakdowns caused throughout the war, he went out again with several Spanish and French ships to try to dam the ships captured by the English, managing to dam the Santa Ana and Neptune. Later it sinks on the coast of Puerto de Santa María as a result of the storm that followed the combat. The number of casualties it had were 5 men killed and 12 wounded.

References

Bibliography 
 John D. Harbron Trafalgar and the Spanish Navy (1988)

External links 
Historia del Navío de línea San Francisco de Asís Revista de Historia Naval 

1767 ships
Ships of the line of the Spanish Navy
Ships built in Spain
Maritime incidents in 1805
Shipwrecks of Spain